Karel Masopust (4 October 1942 in Prague – 25 May 2019) was an ice hockey player who played for the Czechoslovak national team. He won a silver medal at the 1968 Winter Olympics. His death was reported on 25 May 2019.

References

External links

1942 births
2019 deaths
Ice hockey players at the 1968 Winter Olympics
Medalists at the 1968 Winter Olympics
Olympic ice hockey players of Czechoslovakia
Olympic medalists in ice hockey
Olympic silver medalists for Czechoslovakia
San Jose Sharks scouts
Ice hockey people from Prague
Czech ice hockey defencemen
Czechoslovak ice hockey defencemen